Trakas is a Greek surname. Notable people with the surname include:

George Trakas (born 1944), Canadian-American sculptor
Jim Trakas (born 1965), American politician
Sotirios Trakas (born 1987), Greek Olympic diver
 

Greek-language surnames
Surnames